Lasthenia minor is a species of flowering plant in the family Asteraceae known by the common name coastal goldfields. It is endemic to California, where it is a resident of coastal and inland grassland habitat.

Description
Lasthenia minor is an annual herb growing erect to a maximum height near 35 centimeters. The woolly stem may be branched or not and has oppositely-arranged pairs of linear leaves.

The flower heads are under a centimeter wide and have hairy phyllaries and golden yellow ray and disc florets.

The fruit is an achene up to about two millimeters long with a pappus of scales.

External links
Jepson Manual Treatment
USDA Plants Profile
Photo gallery

minor
Endemic flora of California
Flora without expected TNC conservation status